The 1976 Australian Tourist Trophy was a motor race staged at the Phillip Island circuit in Victoria, Australia on 21 November 1976. It was open to Group A Sports Cars and was recognized by the Confederation of Australian Motor Sport as an Australian national title. The race, which was the fourteenth Australian Tourist Trophy, was won by Stuart Kostera of Western Australia, driving an Elfin MS7.

Results

Key:
 NC  = Not classified
 DNF = Did not finish
 DNS = Did not start

Race statistics
 Race distance: 30 laps, 88.2 miles, 141.9 km
 Pole position: Jim Phillips, 1:48.6
 Number of starters: 28
 Number of classified finishers: 7
 Race time of winning car: 57:37.9
 Fastest lap: Jim Phillips, 1:48.8

References and notes

External links
 Elfin-Repco Holden MS7, www.ibcholdings.com.au

Australian Tourist Trophy
Tourist Trophy
Motorsport at Phillip Island